Timmins—Chapleau was a federal electoral district represented in the House of Commons of Canada from 1979 to 1997. It was located in the northeast part of the province of Ontario. This riding was created in 1976 from parts of Cochrane, Nipissing, Timiskaming and Timmins ridings.

It initially consisted of the northern part of the Territorial District of Sudbury, the eastern part of the Territorial District of Algoma, the Township of Teefy, the City of Timmins and the Town of Iroquois Falls in the Territorial District of Cochrane, and the western part of the Territorial District of Timiskaming.

After 1987, it consisted of parts of the Territorial Districts of Algoma, Cochrane, Sudbury and Timiskaming.

The electoral district was abolished in 1996 when it was redistributed between Algoma, Nickel Belt, Timiskaming—Cochrane, and Timmins—James Bay ridings.

Members of Parliament

This riding has elected the following Members of Parliament:

Election results

|- 
  
|Liberal
|Ray Chénier
|align="right"|13,577 
 
|New Democratic Party
|Dennis Welin
|align="right"|10,160   
  
|Progressive Conservative
|Ernie R. White
|align="right"| 7,819  
|}

|- 
  
|Liberal
|Ray Chénier
|align="right"|15,628 
 
|New Democratic Party
|Bill Ferrier
|align="right"| 10,745  
  
|Progressive Conservative
|Kent Davis
|align="right"|3,663 

|}

|- 
  
|Progressive Conservative
|Aurèle Gervais
|align="right"| 11,944   
  
|Liberal
|Marcel Chartrand
|align="right"|10,273 
 
|New Democratic Party
|Cid Samson
|align="right"| 9,543 
 
|No affiliation
|Peter Nastasiuk Bruce
|align="right"| 127  
|}

|- 
 
|New Democratic Party
|Cid Samson
|align="right"| 11,622   
  
|Liberal
|Peter Thalheimer
|align="right"| 10,347   
  
|Progressive Conservative
|Aurèle Gervais
|align="right"| 9,782    
|}

|- 
  
|Liberal
|Peter Thalheimer
|align="right"| 17,085 
 
|New Democratic Party
|Cid Samson
|align="right"| 8,224   
  
|Progressive Conservative
|John Murphy
|align="right"| 4,369

  
|Natural Law
|Ben Lefebvre
|align="right"| 394 
 
|Independent
|Tilton Beaumont
|align="right"| 290   
|}

See also 

 List of Canadian federal electoral districts
 Past Canadian electoral districts

External links 

 Website of the Parliament of Canada

Former federal electoral districts of Ontario
Politics of Timmins